Karen Köhler (born in 1974 in Hamburg) is a German writer, playwright and actor.

Life

Karen Köhler was born in the Barmbek district of Hamburg. She is the daughter of a firefighter and a care home assistant. After graduating from school, she studied acting at the Academy of Music and Theater in Bern. She worked as an actor until 2014, first in permanent positions and then as a freelancer. In 2008, she began working as an author (drama and prose) and illustrator.

In 2010 she became a member of the Hamburg Authors Forum and in 2011 she received the Hamburg Literature Prize. She was invited to give a reading at the Ingeborg Bachmann Prize ceremony in 2014 and received special attention as she was not allowed to attend the event because she had chickenpox. Out of solidarity with her, there was a spontaneous, unofficial reading of Karen Köhler's text Il Comandante at Klagenfurt Lendhafen, which was broadcast on the Internet via livestream. This text is part of her collection of stories Wir haben Raketen geangelt (We Fished for Rockets). After its publication in the summer of 2014, it reached position 36 on the bestseller list for hardcover fiction, was nominated for the Aspects Literature Prize and was translated into several languages. Subsequently, Köhler won various scholarships and artist residencies.

From 2013 to 2015, she wrote a series of plays (a hero trilogy) dealing with the topic of right-wing extremism for the DNT Weimar, which have since been performed in theatres throughout Germany.

In 2019, Köhler was nominated for the German Screenplay Award, which was awarded at the 2019 Berlin International Film Festival, for Cowboy & Indianer (Cowboys & Indians).

She has received several scholarships, including a one-year scholarship from the German Literature Fund for her debut novel Miroloi.  Miroloi was published in 2019 by Carl Hanser Verlag and was on the long list for the 2019 German Book Prize.

Karen Köhler lives in Hamburg.

Works

Theatre

 Pornorama. Ein Männermärchen (Pornorama. A Man Tale). Premiered in 2010.
 Wie ich unter einer Platane eine Erleuchtung hatte, warum sterben uncool ist und das Brot meiner Oma glücklich macht (How I Reached Enlightenment under a Plane Tree, Why Dying Is Uncool and Why My Grandma's Bread Makes You Happy). Premiered in 2012.
 Ramayana. Ein Heldenversuch (Ramayana. A Heroic Attempt). Premiered at the Baden State Theatre in 2013.
 Deine Helden – Meine Träume (Your Heroes – My Dreams). Premiered at DNT Weimar in 2013.
 Helden! Oder: Warum ich einen grünen Umhang trage und gegen die Beschissenheit der Welt ankämpfe (Heroes! Or: Why I Wear a Green Cape and Fight the Shittiness of the World). Premiered at the DNT Weimar in 2014.
 III Helden: Stadt. Land. Traum. (III Heroes: City. Country. Dream.) Premiered at the DNT Weimar in 2015.
 ER. SIE. ES. (HE. SHE. IT.) Premiered at the Baden State Theatre in 2016.

Prose

 Wir haben Raketen geangelt (We Fished for Rockets). Stories. Carl Hanser Verlag, Munich 2014, .
 Miroloi. Novel. Carl Hanser Verlag, Munich 2019, .

Audio books
 Wir haben Raketen geangelt (We Fished for Rockets). Stories. Read by Sandra Hüller and Karen Köhler. Roof Music/Tacheles! Bochum 2015, .
 Miroloi. Novel. Read by Karen Köhler. Roof Music/Tacheles! Bochum 2019, .

Translations

 Nick Drnaso, Sabrina. Graphic Novel. Translated by Karen Köhler and Daniel Beskos. Blumenbar Verlag, Berlin 2019, .
 Steven Withrow, Abzählreim (Counting Rhyme) (Poem), translated by Karen Köhler. In Kenn Nesbitt: Jetzt noch ein Gedicht und dann aus das Licht! (English language version: One Minute Until Bedtime), Hanser Verlag, Munich 2019, .

Publishing

 Akzente 3 / 2019 – Briefe an den Täter (Akzente 3 / 2019 – Letters to the Perpetrator). Magazine series by Akzente. Carl Hanser Verlag, Munich 2019, .

Awards

 2011: 
 2011: Prize from the Austrian Federal Ministry for Education, Art and Culture.
 2013: Otfried Preuβler Theatre for Children Prize
 2015: Rauris Literature Prize from the Salzburg state government
 2015: Advancement award at the Schubart Literature Prize
 2015: Writer in residence for the Goethe Institute in Reykjavik
 2015: Scholar of the German Embassy in Tirana
 2016: Scholar of the Dutch Foundation for Literature in Amsterdam
 2017: Boarder crosser scholarship from the Robert Bosch Foundation
 2017: Laudinella scholarship in St. Moritz from the Hamburg Ministry of Culture and Media
 2018: Scholarship from the German Literature fund
 2019: Work scholarship from the Goethe Institute in Marseille
 2019: Nomination for the German Screenplay Prize for Cowboy & Indianer (Cowboys & Indians)
 2019: Nomination for the German Book Prize for Miroloi
 2020: London scholarship from the German Literature Fund

Literature

 Theo Breuer: Zwanzig Tage – Zwanzig Romane: Ein Buchspiel (Twenty Days – Twenty Novels: A Book Game). In: Matrix. Zeitschrift für Literatur und Kunst (Magazine for Literature and Art), Edition 58., Pop Verlag, Ludwigsburg 2019, pp. 7–167.

External links

 
 
 Offizielle Webpräsenz, Website Karen Köhler
 Hanser Verlag, Autorenseite
 Ingeborg-Bachmann-Preis 2014, Autorenseite
 Interview zum Buch Wir haben Raketen geangelt, BR Fernsehen LeseZeichen 15 December 2014, mit Video 7 Min.
 Verlag für Kindertheater, Autorenseite

References

1974 births
Living people
21st-century German women writers
German women dramatists and playwrights
Writers from Hamburg